Gospel music is a traditional genre of Christian music, and a cornerstone of Christian media. The creation, performance, significance, and even the definition of gospel music varies according to culture and social context. Gospel music is composed and performed for many purposes, including aesthetic pleasure, religious or ceremonial purposes, and as an entertainment product for the marketplace. Gospel music is characterized by dominant vocals and strong use of harmony with Christian lyrics. Gospel music can be traced to the early 17th century.

Hymns and sacred songs were often repeated in a call and response fashion, heavily influenced by ancestral African music. Most of the churches relied on hand-clapping and foot-stomping as rhythmic accompaniment. Most of the singing was done a cappella. The first published use of the term "gospel song" probably appeared in 1874.

The original gospel songs were written and composed by authors such as George F. Root, Philip Bliss, Charles H. Gabriel, William Howard Doane, and Fanny Crosby. Gospel music publishing houses emerged. The advent of radio in the 1920s greatly increased the audience for gospel music. Following World War II, gospel music moved into major auditoriums, and gospel music concerts became quite elaborate.

Black and Southern gospel music are largely responsible for gospel's continued presence in contemporary Christian music, with soul music by far the best-known popular music variant. The styles emerged from the African-American music and American folk music traditions and have evolved in various ways over the years, continuing to form the basis of Black church worship even today. It has also come to be used in churches of various other cultural traditions (especially within Pentecostalism) and, via the gospel choir phenomenon spearheaded by Thomas Dorsey, has become a form of musical devotion worldwide. Southern used all-male, tenor-lead-baritone-bass quartets. Progressive Southern gospel has grown out of Southern gospel over the past couple of decades. Christian country music, sometimes referred to as country gospel music, is a subgenre of gospel music with a country flair. It peaked in popularity in the mid-1990s. Bluegrass gospel music is rooted in American mountain music. Celtic gospel music infuses gospel music with a Celtic flair, and is quite popular in countries such as Ireland. British black gospel refers to Gospel music of the African diaspora produced in the UK.

History 
According to Yale University music professor Willie Ruff, the singing of psalms in Scottish Gaelic by Presbyterians of the Scottish Hebrides evolved from "lining out"—where one person sang a solo and others followed—into the call and response of gospel music of the American South. Another theory notes foundations in the works of Dr. Isaac Watts and others.

Moreover, the genre arose during a time when literacy was not a guarantee, utilizing a great deal of repetition (which, unlike more traditional hymns, allowed those who could not read the opportunity to participate).

18th century 
Perhaps the most famous gospel-based hymns were composed in the 1760s and 1770s by English writers John Newton ("Amazing Grace") and Augustus Toplady ("Rock of Ages"), members of the Anglican Church. Starting out as lyrics only, it took decades for standardized tunes to be added to them. Although not directly connected with African-American gospel music, they were adopted by African-Americans as well as white Americans, and Newton's connection with the abolition movement provided cross-fertilization.

Holiness-Pentecostal era (19th century) 

The first published use of the term "Gospel song" probably appeared in 1874 when Philip Bliss released a songbook entitled Gospel Songs. A Choice Collection of Hymns and Tunes. It was used to describe a new style of church music, songs that were easy to grasp and more easily singable than the traditional church hymns, which came out of the mass revival movement starting with Dwight L. Moody, whose musician was Ira D. Sankey, as well as the Holiness-Pentecostal movement. Prior to the meeting of Moody and Sankey in 1870, there was an American rural/frontier history of revival and camp meeting songs, but the gospel hymn was of a different character, and it served the needs of mass revivals in the great cities.

The revival movement employed popular singers and song leaders, the most famous of them being Ira D. Sankey. The original "gospel" songs were written and composed by authors such as George F. Root, Philip Bliss, Charles H. Gabriel, William Howard Doane, and Fanny Crosby. As an extension to his initial publication Gospel Songs, Philip Bliss, in collaboration with Ira D. Sankey issued no's. 1 to 6 of Gospel Hymns in 1875. Sankey and Bliss's collection can be found in many libraries today.

The popularity of revival singers and the openness of rural churches to this type of music (in spite of its initial use in city revivals) led to the late 19th and early 20th century establishment of gospel music publishing houses such as those of Homer Rodeheaver, E. O. Excell, Charlie Tillman, and Charles Tindley. These publishers were in the market for large quantities of new music, providing an outlet for the creative work of many songwriters and composers.

The advent of radio in the 1920s greatly increased the audience for gospel music, and James D. Vaughan used radio as an integral part of his business model, which also included traveling quartets to publicize the gospel music books he published several times a year. Virgil O. Stamps and Jesse R. Baxter studied Vaughan's business model and by the late 1920s were running heavy competition for Vaughan. The 1920s also saw the marketing of gospel records by groups such as the Carter Family.

Emergence of Black gospel (1920s–1970s) 

The Pentecostal movement quickly made inroads with churches not attuned to the Europeanized Black church music that had become popular over the years since Emancipation. These congregations readily adopted and contributed to the gospel music publications of the early 20th century. Sister Rosetta Tharpe, pioneer of rock and roll, soon emerged from this tradition as the first great gospel recording artist. The first person to introduce ragtime to gospel (and the first to play piano on a gospel recording) was Arizona Dranes.

The 1930s saw the rise of Black gospel quartets such as the Five Blind Boys of Mississippi and the Five Blind Boys of Alabama. In addition to these high-profile quartets, there were many Black gospel musicians performing in the 1920s and 30s, usually playing the guitar and singing in the streets of Southern cities.

In the 1930s, in Chicago, Thomas A. Dorsey turned to gospel music, establishing a publishing house. It has been said that 1930 was the year traditional black gospel music began, as the National Baptist Convention first publicly endorsed the music at its 1930 meeting. Dorsey was responsible for developing the musical careers of many African-American artists, such as Mahalia Jackson (best known for her rendition of his "Precious Lord, Take My Hand").

Meanwhile, radio continued to develop an audience for gospel music, a fact that was commemorated in Albert E. Brumley's 1937 song, "Turn Your Radio On" (which is still being published in gospel song books). (In 1972, a recording of "Turn Your Radio On" by the Lewis Family was nominated for Gospel Song of the Year.)

In 1964, the Gospel Music Association was established, which in turn began the Dove Awards (in 1969) and the Gospel Music Hall of Fame (in 1972). Both of the latter two groups began primarily for Southern gospel performers, but in the late 1970s, began including artists of other subgenres, which brought in many Black artists. Also in 1969, James Cleveland established the Gospel Music Workshop of America, a Black gospel outlet.

Late 20th-century musicians such as Elvis Presley, Jerry Lee Lewis, and the Blackwood Brothers were also known for their gospel influences and recordings.

Contemporary Black gospel and gospel rap (1970s–present) 

 	
Urban contemporary gospel emerged in the late 1960s and early 70s with Walter Hawkins highly popular "Oh Happy Day" which is still performed worldwide in the 2000. Artists such as James Cleveland, Aretha Franklin, the Clark Sisters, Andrae Crouch and Richard Smallwood followed crossing over musically and gaining notoriety, and this pattern would repeat itself in subsequent decades, with new artists like Yolanda Adams and Kirk Franklin making increasingly more bold forays into the secular world with their musical stylings. The current sphere of Black gospel recording artists is almost exclusively of the urban contemporary bent.

Also of note is the rise of Christian (or gospel) rap/hip-hop, which has gained increasing popularity since the days of the Gospel Gangstaz and The Cross Movement. Often considered a subgenre of urban contemporary gospel, Christian rap has become dominated in present times by artists from Reach Records, who have seen perhaps the most commercial success of any artists in the gospel genre; Lecrae (the label's founder and preeminent artist) has charted in the top 10 of on the Billboard 200 three times, with his 2014 album "Anomaly" debuting at No. 1.

Subgenres

Black gospel

Traditional 

Traditional Black gospel music is the most well-known form, often seen in Black churches, non-Black Pentecostal and evangelical churches, and in entertainment spaces across the country and world. It originates from the Southeastern United States ("the South"), where most Black Americans lived prior to the Great Migration. This music was highly influenced by the hymnody of the spirituals and of Watts and, later, the musical style and vision of Dorsey. Whereas northern Black churches did not at first welcome Dorsey's music (having become accustomed to their own more Eurocentric flavorings), after the Southern migrants' new churches became more popular, so did gospel music, gospel choirs, and the general trend toward exclusive use of this music in Black churches. Dorsey, Mahalia Jackson, the Mississippi Mass Choir, and the Georgia Mass Choir are but a few notable examples.

Urban contemporary 

Developing out of the fusion of traditional Black gospel with the styles of secular Black music popular in the 70s and 80s, Urban Contemporary gospel is the most common form of recorded gospel music today. It relies heavily on rhythms and instrumentation common in the secular music of the contemporary era (often including the use of electronic beats), while still incorporating the themes and heritage of the traditional Black gospel genre. Kirk Franklin is the foremost (and by far the bestselling) individual in this genre, while Andrae Crouch, the Clark Sisters, and Yolanda Adams are also very popular and noteworthy.

British 
British black gospel refers to gospel music of the African diaspora in the UK. It is also often referred to as "UK gospel". The distinctive sound is heavily influenced by UK street culture with many artists from the African and Caribbean majority black churches in the UK. The genre has gained recognition in various awards such as the GEM (Gospel Entertainment Music) Awards, MOBO Awards, Urban Music Awards and has its own Official Christian & Gospel Albums Chart.

Southern gospel music 

Southern gospel music comes from the Southeastern United States and is similar in sound to Christian country music, but it sometimes known as "quartet music" for its traditional "four men and a piano" set up. The genre, while remaining predominantly White, began to integrate Black gospel stylings in the 1960s. It has evolved over the years into a popular form of music across the United States and overseas, especially among baby boomers and those living in the South. Like other forms of music the creation, performance, significance, and even the definition of southern gospel varies according to culture and social context. It is composed and performed for many purposes, ranging from aesthetic pleasure, religious or ceremonial purposes, or as an entertainment product for the marketplace.

Christian country music 

Christian country music, sometimes referred to as country gospel music, is a subgenre of gospel music with a country flair, is also known as inspirational country. Christian country over the years has progressed into a mainstream country sound with inspirational or positive country lyrics. In the mid-1990s, Christian country hit its highest popularity. This popularity was such that mainstream artists like Larry Gatlin, Charlie Daniels and Barbara Mandrell, just to name a few, began recording music that had this positive Christian country flair. These mainstream artists have now become award winners in this genre.

Comparison to other hymnody 
Some proponents of "standard" hymns generally dislike gospel music of the late 19th and early 20th centuries. For example, Patrick and Sydnor complain that commercial success led to a proliferation of such music, and "deterioration, even in a standard which to begin with was not high, resulted." They went on to say, "there is no doubt that a deterioration in taste follows the use of this type of hymn and tune; it fosters an attachment to the trivial and sensational which dulls and often destroys sense of the dignity and beauty which best befit the song that is used in the service of God."

Gold reviewed the issue in 1958, and collected a number of quotations similar to the complaints of Patrick and Sydnor. However, he also provided this quotation: "Gospel hymnody has the distinction of being America's most typical contribution to Christian song. As such, it is valid in its inspiration and in its employment."

Today, with historical distance, there is a greater acceptance of such gospel songs into official denominational hymnals. For example, the United Methodist Church made this acceptance explicit in The Faith We Sing, a 2000 supplement to the official denominational hymnal. In the preface, the editors say, "Experience has shown that some older treasures were missed when the current hymnals were compiled."

See also 

 Gospel Music Hall of Fame
 List of gospel musicians
 Phillip Paul Bliss House
 Soul music
 Stellar Awards

References

Bibliography

Further reading 

 Allen, Ray. Singing in the Spirit: African-American Sacred Quartets in New York City, in series, Publication[s] of the American Folklore Society: New Series. Philadelphia, Pennsylvania: University of Pennsylvania Press, 1991. xx,[2], 268 p., ill. with b&w photos.  pbk.
 Barlow, Sanna Morrison. Mountain Singing: the Story of Gospel Recordings in the Philippines. Hong Kong: Alliance Press, 1952. 352 p.
 Blackwell, Lois. The Wings of a Dove: The Story of Gospel Music in America. Norfolk: Donning, 1978.
 Boyer, Horace Clarence. How Sweet the Sound: The Golden Age of Gospel. Elliott and Clark, 1995. .
 Broughton, Viv. Too Close to Heaven: The Illustrated History of Gospel Music. Midnight Books, 1996. .
 Albert E Brumley & Sons. The Best of Albert E. Brumley. Gospel Songs, 1966, paperback Amazing Grace 
 Cleall, Charles. Sixty Songs From Sankey. London: Marshall, Morgan and Scott, 1960.
 
 Cusic, Don. The Sound of Light: a History of Gospel Music. Bowling Green, Ohio: Bowling Green State University Popular Press, 1990. iv, 267 p.  pbk.
 Darden, Robert. People Get Ready: A New History of Black Gospel Music. Continuum International Publishing Group, 2005, .
 Downey, James C. The Gospel Hymn 1875–1930. University of Southern Mississippi, MA, 1963.
 Eskew, Harry. "Gospel Music, I" in The New Grove Dictionary of Music and Musicians (1980), VII, 549–554.
 Hanson, Kenneth, The Hymnody and Hymnals of the Restoration Movement. Butler University, BD, 1951.
 Heilbut, Tony, The Gospel Sound: Good News and Bad Times, Limelight Editions, 1997, .
 McNeil, W. K., ed. Encyclopedia of American Gospel Music. Routledge, 2005. .
 Marovich, Robert M., A City Called Heaven: Chicago and the Birth of Gospel Music. Urbana: University of Illinois Press, 2015. .
 Mungons, Kevin and Douglas Yeo, Homer Rodeheaver and the Rise of the Gospel Music Industry. Urbana: University of Illinois Press, 2021. .
 Stevenson, Arthur L. The Story of Southern Hymnology. Roanoke, Virginia: Stone Printing and Manufacturing, 1931.
 Zolten, Jerry. Great God A' Mighty!: The Dixie Hummingbirds – Celebrating The Rise of Soul Gospel Music. Oxford University Press, 2003. .

Archival sources
 USC Gospel Music History Archive
 Finding aid to Camille Taylor collection of Black Music Caucus Gospel Choir Competition recordings at Columbia University. Rare Book & Manuscript Library.
 Guide to the Gospel Sheet Music Collection at the Center for Black Music Research

External links

Professional organizations 
 Gospel Music Association – Acknowledges all forms of gospel/Christian music
 Gospel Viu – Gospel Without Borders
 Gospel Wire – Primarily urban contemporary gospel
 Pacific Gospel Music Association – Known for Southern gospel
 Southern Gospel Music Association
 Gospel Music Information
 Festival Lumen – the biggest gospel music festival in central Europe

Media outlets 
 Black Family Channel
 Bobby Jones Gospel
 Christian Broadcasting Network
 Daystar Television Network
 Gospel Music Channel
 The Inspirational Network
 Trinity Broadcasting Network
KALO TV

 
African-American music
Christian music genres
Articles containing video clips
African-American cultural history